The year 685 BC was a year of the pre-Julian Roman calendar. In the Roman Empire, it was known as year 69 Ab urbe condita . The denomination 685 BC for this year has been used since the early medieval period, when the Anno Domini calendar era became the prevalent method in Europe for naming years.

Events

By place

Mediterranean 
 Traditional date of the foundation of Chalcedon by Megara.

Births 
 Ashurbanipal, king of Assyria (d. c. 627 BC)

Deaths

References